Lysinibacillus composti is a Gram-positive, rod-shaped, endospore-forming and motile bacterium from the genus of Lysinibacillus which has been isolated from compost.

References

Bacillaceae
Bacteria described in 2014